Lisa Demetz (born 21 May 1989) is an Italian ski jumper who represents as a military athlete the C.S. Esercito.

Demetz, born in Bolzano, made her debut in the Continental Cup, the highest level in women's ski jumping, on 23 July 2004 with an 11th place in Park City. She has finished among the top three 4 times, with one win and two second places.

She was selected to compete for Italy in the 2011 World Championship in Oslo.

Further notable results
 2004: 2nd, Italian championships of ski jumping, K62
 2005:
 1st, Italian championships of ski jumping
 1st, Italian championships of ski jumping, K60
 2007: 1st, Italian championships of ski jumping
 2008: 2nd, Italian championships of ski jumping
 2009: 1st, Italian championships of ski jumping
 2010: 1st, Italian championships of ski jumping
 2011: 1st, Italian championships of ski jumping

References

1989 births
Living people
Italian female ski jumpers
Sportspeople from Bolzano
Ski jumpers of Gruppo Sportivo Esercito
Universiade medalists in ski jumping
Universiade bronze medalists for Italy
Competitors at the 2011 Winter Universiade
20th-century Italian women
21st-century Italian women